David Ogilvy, 9th Earl of Airlie  (16 December 1785 – 20 August 1849) was a Scottish peer and planter.

Early life
David was the youngest son of Walter Ogilvy, who was de jure 8th Earl of Airlie, and Jean Ogilvy.

Titles
On 26 May 1826 he succeeded to the title of 9th Earl of Airlie, after his honours were restored by Act of Parliament. He succeeded also to the titles of 10th Lord Ogilvy of Airlie and 4th Lord Ogilvy of Alith and Lintrathen. He gained the rank of captain in the service of the 42nd Regiment of Foot. Between 1833 and 1849 he held the office of Representative peer of Scotland. David held the office of Lord Lieutenant of Angus which in that time it was known as Forfarshire.

The 1833 steam locomotive, Earl of Airlie, was named after him; it ran on the Dundee and Newtyle Railway, of which he was a director.

Slave holder
According to the Legacies of British Slave-Ownership at the University College London, Airlie was awarded compensation in the aftermath of the Slavery Abolition Act 1833 with the Slave Compensation Act 1837.

Airlie was associated with "T71/865 St Andrew claim no. 543 (Ferry Pen)", he owned 59 slaves in Jamaica and received a £1,362 payment at the time (worth £ in ).

Death
He died aged 63 at Regent Street, London, England. In May 1851 his will was probated.

Marriages and family
On 7 October 1812 he married, firstly, Clementina Drummond, daughter of Gavin Drummond and Clementina Graham.

They had three children:

Lady Jean Graham Drummond Ogilvy (27 February 1818 – 4 March 1902)
Walter Ogilvy (21 September 1823 – 27 March 1824)
David Graham Drummond Ogilvy, 10th Earl of Airlie (4 May 1826 – 25 September 1881)

On 15 November 1838 he married, secondly, Margaret Bruce, daughter of William Bruce, at 6 Heriot Row, Edinburgh, Scotland.

They had four children:

William Henry Bruce Ogilvy (26 February 1840 – 1912)
James Bruce Ogilvy (1 December 1841 – 15 May 1888)
John Bruce Ogilvy (17 June 1845 – 1904)
Donald Bruce Ogilvy (17 June 1845 – 16 December 1890)

Notes and sources

1785 births
1849 deaths
Scottish representative peers
Lord-Lieutenants of Angus
Earls of Airlie
Recipients of payments from the Slavery Abolition Act 1833
Scottish slave owners